Glyphoglossus molossus is a species of frog in the family Microhylidae. Its common names include blunt-headed burrowing frog and balloon frog.

Distribution and habitat
Glyphoglossus molossus is found in Cambodia, Laos, Myanmar, Thailand, and Vietnam.
Its natural habitat is subtropical or tropical seasonal forests, moist savanna, intermittent freshwater marshes, rural gardens, temporary ponds, and heavily degraded former forest.

Breeding biology

These large, burrowing frogs follow the general theme of microhylids that deposit aquatic eggs over and over. There is explosive breeding activity in ephemeral water sources such as ponds and ditches. The frogs perform multiple amplectic dips to oviposit surface films of pigmented eggs. A portion of a clutch is released with each dip, with a dip lasting for about 6 seconds. 200–300 eggs are released per dip. The ova have a dark black animal pole and yellow vegetal pole. Tadpoles feed by filtering suspended material in the water column.

Status
Glyphoglossus molossus is threatened by over-harvesting (see below) and habitat loss.

As food
In certain areas this frog is collected in large numbers as food during the breeding season.

The balloon frog is very popular as a food item in Thailand, where it has been traditionally considered a delicacy in Thai cuisine, the frog's texture and taste reputedly being so exquisite that it can be eaten whole. 
Natural populations of this amphibian, however, have been severely depleted in most areas of the country owing to overcatching. Currently projects are undertaken to breed and release these frogs into their natural habitat. The first place where breeding was undertaken at Phayao Inland Fisheries Research and Development Center in 2009. Later breeding was undertaken at Lamphun Inland Fisheries and Development Center in 2011.

See also
 List of Thai ingredients

References

External links 

 อึ่งปากขวด / Glyphoglossus molossus (Gunther, 1869) / Truncate-snouted spadefoot frog
 Eung yang อึ่ง หรือ อึ่งยัดใส้ปิ้ง

molossus
Amphibians of Myanmar
Amphibians of Cambodia
Amphibians of Laos
Amphibians of Thailand
Amphibians of Vietnam
Thai cuisine
Taxa named by Albert Günther
Taxonomy articles created by Polbot
Amphibians described in 1868